Belarus competed at the 2018 Winter Olympics in Pyeongchang, South Korea, from 9 to 25 February 2018, with 33 competitors in 6 sports. They won three medals in total, two gold and one silver, ranking 15th in the medal table.

Medalists

Competitors  

The following is the list of number of competitors participating at the Games per sport/discipline.

Alpine skiing 

Belarus has qualified one male and one female skier:

Biathlon 

Based on their Nations Cup rankings in the 2016–17 Biathlon World Cup, Belarus has qualified a team of 5 men and 5 women.

Men

Women

Mixed

Cross-country skiing 

Belarus has qualified four male and five female skiers:

Distance
Men

Women

Sprint

Qualification legend: Q – Qualify on position in heat; q – Qualify on time in round

Freestyle skiing 

Belarus has qualified three male and three female skiers:

Aerials

Short track speed skating 

Belarus has qualified one skater for men's 1500 m events for the Olympics during the four World Cup events in November 2017.

Speed skating

Belarus earned the following quotas at the conclusion of the four World Cup's used for qualification.

Individual

Mass start

References

Nations at the 2018 Winter Olympics
2018
Winter Olympics